Ammonium persulfate (APS) is the inorganic compound with the formula (NH4)2S2O8. It is a colourless (white) salt that is highly soluble in water, much more so than the related potassium salt. It is a strong oxidizing agent that is used as a catalyst in polymer chemistry, as an etchant, and as a cleaning and bleaching agent.

Preparation and structure
Ammonium persulfate is prepared by electrolysis of a cold concentrated solution of either ammonium sulfate or ammonium bisulfate in sulfuric acid at a high current density. The method was first described by Hugh Marshall.

The ammonium, sodium, and potassium salts adopt very similar structures in the solid state, according to X-ray crystallography.  In the ammonium salt, the O-O distance is 1.497Å.  The sulfate groups are tetrahedral, with three short S-O distances near 1.44Å and one long S-O bond at 1.64Å.

Uses
As a source of radicals, APS is mainly used as a radical initiator in the polymerization of certain alkenes. Commercially important polymers prepared using persulfates include styrene-butadiene rubber and polytetrafluoroethylene.  In solution, the dianion dissociates into radicals:
[O3SO–OSO3]2−   2 [SO4]•−
Regarding its mechanism of action, the sulfate radical adds to the alkene to give a sulfate ester radical.  It is also used along with tetramethylethylenediamine to catalyze the polymerization of acrylamide in making a polyacrylamide gel, hence being important for SDS-PAGE and western blot.

Illustrative of its powerful oxidizing properties, ammonium persulfate is used to etch copper on printed circuit boards as an alternative to ferric chloride solution.  This property was discovered many years ago. In 1908, John William Turrentine used a dilute ammonium persulfate solution to etch copper.  Turrentine weighed copper spirals before placing the copper spirals into the ammonium persulfate solution for an hour.  After an hour, the spirals were weighed again and the amount of copper dissolved by ammonium persulfate was recorded.  This experiment was extended to other metals such as nickel, cadmium, and iron, all of which yielded similar results.
The oxidation equation is thus:  (aq) + 2  → 2  (aq).

Ammonium persulfate is a standard ingredient in hair bleach.

Persulfates are used as oxidants in organic chemistry. For example, in the Minisci reaction and Elbs persulfate oxidation

Safety
Airborne dust containing ammonium persulfate may be irritating to eye, nose, throat, lung and skin upon contact. Exposure to high levels of dust may cause difficulty in breathing.

It has been noted that persulfate salts are a major cause of asthmatic effects.  Furthermore, it has been suggested that exposure to ammonium persulfate can cause asthmatic effects in hair dressers and receptionists working in the hairdressing industry.  These asthmatic effects are proposed to be caused by the oxidation of cysteine residues, as well as methionine residues.

References

External links
International Chemical Safety Card 0632

Persulfates
Peroxides
Ammonium compounds
Oxidizing agents